Hydroperoxyeicosatetraenoic acid (HPETE) may refer to:

5-HPETE
8-HPETE
12-HPETE
15-HPETE